Clarkson, Ontario can mean the following places:
Clarkson, Mississauga
Clarkson, Waterloo Regional Municipality, Ontario
Clarkson Township, Ontario a township in Nipissing